The 2018 AFC Champions League qualifying play-offs were played from 16 to 30 January 2018. A total of 22 teams competed in the qualifying play-offs to decide eight of the 32 places in the group stage of the 2018 AFC Champions League.

Teams
The following 22 teams, split into two regions (West Region and East Region), entered the qualifying play-offs, consisting of three rounds:
4 teams entered in the preliminary round 1.
6 teams entered in the preliminary round 2.
12 teams entered in the play-off round.

Format

In the qualifying play-offs, each tie was played as a single match. Extra time and penalty shoot-out were used to decide the winner if necessary (Regulations Article 9.2). The eight winners of the play-off round advanced to the group stage to join the 24 direct entrants. All losers in each round from associations with only play-off slots entered the AFC Cup group stage.

Schedule
The schedule of each round was as follows.

Bracket

The bracket of the qualifying play-offs for each region was determined by the AFC based on the association ranking of each team, with the team from the higher-ranked association hosting the match. Teams from the same association could not be placed into the same play-off.

Play-off West 1
 Al-Ain advanced to Group D.

Play-off West 2
 Zob Ahan advanced to Group B.

Play-off West 3
 Al-Gharafa advanced to Group A.

Play-off West 4
 Nasaf Qarshi advanced to Group C.

Play-off East 1
 Suwon Samsung Bluewings advanced to Group H.

Play-off East 2
 Kashiwa Reysol advanced to Group E.

Play-off East 3
 Shanghai SIPG advanced to Group F.

Play-off East 4
 Tianjin Quanjian advanced to Group E.

Preliminary round 1

Summary
A total of four teams played in the preliminary round 1.

|+East Region

East Region

Preliminary round 2

Summary
A total of eight teams played in the preliminary round 2: six teams which entered in this round, and two winners of the preliminary round 1.

|+East Region

East Region

Play-off round

Summary
A total of 16 teams played in the play-off round: twelve teams which entered in this round, and four winners of the preliminary round 2.

|+West Region

|+East Region

West Region

East Region

Notes

References

External links
, the-AFC.com
AFC Champions League 2018, stats.the-AFC.com

1
January 2018 sports events in Asia